Bridgepoint may refer to:

Bridgepoint Group, a European private equity firm
Bridgepoint Education, an American for-profit educational services holding company
Holiday Bowl, an NCAA college football bowl game formerly known as the Bridgepoint Education Holiday Bowl
Bridgepoint Health, a Toronto hospital and research centre
Bridgepoint Historic District, listed on the NRHP in Somerset County, New Jersey